Falsarthrobacter nasiphocae is a species of bacteria from the family Micrococcaceae.

References

Micrococcaceae
Bacteria described in 2002
Monotypic bacteria genera